TPH Partners is a private equity firm headquartered in Houston, Texas, USA.

History
TPH Partners was founded in 2008 as the private equity arm of Tudor, Pickering, Holt & Co., an investment bank.

In 2013, it established Elk Meadows Resources, a company focused on "acquiring and developing onshore oil and gas properties in the Permian Basin as well as the Rockies."

In 2015, it co-founded Laurel Mountain Energy with Vista Resources.

References

Private equity firms of the United States
Companies based in Houston
Financial services companies established in 2008